Sir Stephen Popham (c. 1386 – 12 November 1444), born in Popham, Hampshire was an English Member of Parliament.

Popham was the son and heir of Henry Popham, MP for Hampshire of Popham, Hampshire. He fought in France in 1415 with his cousin, Sir John Popham under Edward, Duke of York on the right wing of Henry V’s army at Agincourt. He was knighted by 1418, possibly on the field at Agincourt. He was elected MP for Hampshire five times (1420, 1423, 1425, 1431 and 1442). He also served on a number of commissions and was selected High Sheriff of Hampshire between 1427–28 and 1440–41, and High Sheriff of Wiltshire between 1434–35.

Family

Popham married twice and had two daughters. His estates passed to his daughters, whilst those entailed passed to his cousin and fellow soldier, Sir John Popham.

His daughter, Elizabeth, married Sir John Wadham of Merryfield and Edge.

References

1380s births
1444 deaths
People from Basingstoke and Deane
English soldiers
English knights
English MPs 1420
High Sheriffs of Hampshire
High Sheriffs of Wiltshire
Knights Bachelor
Politicians awarded knighthoods
Stephen
English MPs 1423
English MPs 1425
English MPs 1431
English MPs 1442